The sand-colored soft-furred rat (Millardia gleadowi) is a species of rodent in the family Muridae.
It is found in India and Pakistan.

References

Millardia
Mammals of Afghanistan
Mammals of Pakistan
Mammals described in 1886
Taxonomy articles created by Polbot